Elstal is a railway station located in Wustermark, Germany. The station is located on the Berlin-Lehrte Railway. The train services are operated by Deutsche Bahn and Ostdeutsche Eisenbahn (ODEG).

Next to the station is a large goods yard, including two former turntables.

Train services
The station is serves by the following service(s):

Regional services  Rathenow - Wustermark - Berlin - Ludwigsfelde - Jüterbog
Peak hour services  Wustermark - Berlin-Spandau

References

Railway stations in Brandenburg
Buildings and structures in Havelland (district)